The BMW 8 Series is a range of grand tourer coupes and convertibles produced by BMW.

The 8 Series was introduced in 1990 under the E31 model code and was only available as a two-door coupé. It is powered by a range of naturally aspirated V8 and V12 petrol engines. The E31 started production just as E24 6 Series production ended, however it is not considered a direct successor. The E31 was discontinued in 1999 due to poor sales.

The model range was later reintroduced in 2018 with the second generation, G15 8 Series. It launched in coupé (G15), convertible (G14), and four-door Gran Coupé (G16) body styles, as the successor to the F06/F12/F13 6 Series lineup. The G15 8 Series introduces an inline-six diesel engine, and a high-performance BMW M8 trim later joined the lineup as well as the luxury inspired Alpina B8.


First generation (E31; 1990–1999) 

Design work of the first generation E31 8 Series began in 1984, with final design phase and production development starting in 1986. The car debuted at the 1989 Frankfurt Motor Show, and was produced until 1999. The 8 Series was designed to move beyond the market of the original E24 6 Series, featuring greater performance and an increased price. The 8 Series was the first road car to offer a V12 engine mated to a 6-speed manual transmission and was one of the first vehicles to be fitted with electronic drive-by-wire throttle. The 8 Series was also one of BMW's first cars to use a multi-link rear axle.

Second generation (G14/G15/G16; 2018–present) 

The BMW 8 Series (G14) was announced on June 15, 2018, with sales commencing from November 2018. It was initially available as a coupé (codenamed G15), with the convertible (G14) and four-door Gran Coupé (G16) variants introduced later, succeeding the F06/F12/F13 6 Series lineup. Production commenced in late 2018 at the BMW assembly plant in Dingolfing, Germany.

Direct competitors to the BMW 8 Series coupé and convertible are the Mercedes-AMG GT coupé & cabriolet and Porsche 911 coupé & cabriolet. The BMW 8 Series Gran Coupé which has improved rear passenger space dimensions compared to the BMW 6 Series Gran Coupé (F06), is seen as a flashier sportier alternative to its platform-mate, the more traditional BMW 7 Series sedan, and it competes with the Mercedes-AMG GT 4-Door Coupé and Porsche Panamera.

In 2022, BMW updated the 8 Series with an updated look and tech. The Iconic Illuminated Glow kidney grille has been added, as is a larger 12.3-inch infotainment system that replaces the 10.25-inch unit.

References 

8 Series
Rear-wheel-drive vehicles
Coupés
Grand tourers